Ministry of Parliamentary Affairs Department Maharashtra is a Ministry of Government of Maharashtra.

The Ministry is currently headed by Chandrakant Patil, a Cabinet Minister

List of Cabinet Ministers

List of Ministers of State

References

Government ministries of Maharashtra